The 2018 Svenska Cupen final was played on 10 May 2018 between Djurgårdens IF and Malmö FF at Tele2 Arena, Stockholm, the home ground of Djurgårdens IF, determined in a draw on 21 March 2018 after the semi-finals. The final was the culmination of the 2017–18 Svenska Cupen, the 62nd season of Svenska Cupen and the sixth season with the current format.

Djurgården won their fifth Svenska Cupen title after defeating Malmö 3–0, earning themselves a place in the second qualifying round of the 2018–19 UEFA Europa League.

Teams

Venue
Since the 2014–15 season, the venue for the Svenska Cupen final is decided in a draw between the two finalists. The draw for the final was held on 21 March 2018 at the annual pre-season kick-off meeting in Stockholm and decided that the final would be played at Tele2 Arena in Stockholm, the home venue of Djurgårdens IF. This was the first cup final to be hosted at the venue and the second consecutive final to be played on artificial turf.

Background
The Allsvenskan clubs Djurgårdens IF and Malmö FF contested the final, with the winner earning a place in the second qualifying round of the 2018–19 UEFA Europa League. Since Malmö were qualified for the first qualifying round of the 2018–19 UEFA Champions League and Djurgården were qualified for the first qualifying round of the 2018–19 UEFA Europa League through their positions in the 2017 Allsvenskan, Sweden's fourth European place was given to BK Häcken as the 4th team of the 2017 Allsvenskan. Djurgården was given a place in the second qualifying round of the 2018–19 UEFA Europa League since they won the final.

Djurgården played their first final since 2013 and their ninth in total. Malmö played their first final since 2016 and their 19th in total. Both clubs lost in their previous final appearances. Having met in 1951, 1975, and 1989, this was the fourth final to contest the two clubs. Malmö had won all of the prior meetings in the final of the competition. The 1989 final was notably the last time Malmö won the competition, Djurgården had last won a cup title in 2005. The clubs faced each other twice in Allsvenskan prior to the cup final, at Tele2 Arena on 18 April where Djurgården won 3–0, and at Stadion on 3 May where Malmö won 1–0.

Route to the final

Note: In all results below, the score of the finalist is given first (H: home; A: away).

Match

Details

References

Svenska Cupen Final
Svenska Cupen Final 2018
Svenska Cupen Final 2018
Svenska Cupen Finals
Svenska Cupen Final
Svenska Cupen Final 2018